The 1984 CONCACAF Under-20 Championship was held in Trinidad and Tobago. It also served as qualification for the 1985 FIFA World Youth Championship.

Teams
Jamaica and Suriname withdrew before the tournament and the Dominican Republic confirmed their participation too late. The following teams entered the tournament:

Round 1

Group 1

Group 2

Group 3

Group 4

Round 2

Group A

Group B

Semifinals

Third place match

Final

Qualification to World Youth Championship
The two best performing teams qualified for the 1985 FIFA World Youth Championship.

External links
Results by RSSSF

CONCACAF Under-20 Championship
1984 in youth association football